Kingston Road may refer to:

 Kingston Road, London, England
 Kingston Road, Oxford, England
 Kingston Road (Toronto), Canada
 Durham Regional Highway 2, the continuation of the Toronto Kingston Road into Durham Region

See also 
 Kingston Bridge (disambiguation)